The Indonesian television mystery music game show I Can See Your Voice Indonesia premiered the second season on MNCTV with the first part on 30 January 2017, and then the second part on 15 May 2017.

This season also aired the first episode featuring an entire lineup of kids (also with fellow child guest artist ) as mystery singers.

Gameplay

Format
Under the original format, the guest artist can eliminate one or two mystery singers after each round. The game concludes with the last mystery singer standing which depends on the outcome of a duet performance with a guest artist.

Rewards
If the singer is good, he/she will feature on a privilege video; if the singer is bad, he/she wins .

Rounds
Each episode presents the guest artist with seven people whose identities and singing voices are kept concealed until they are eliminated to perform on the "stage of truth" or remain in the end to perform the final duet.

Episodes

Guest artists

Panelists

Notes

References

I Can See Your Voice Indonesia
2017 Indonesian television seasons